Karmarts, formerly known as DiStar Electric Corporation, is an importer and distributor of multi bands cosmetic goods and beauty products. The company once was a manufacturer and distributor of electronic goods under the brand DiStar.

History
The company was established as DiStar Electric Corporation on 11 May 1982 and registered as a public company on 18 March 1994.
The company was listed on the Stock Exchange of Thailand on 31 October 1994.

References

External links
Official website 
Companies based in Bangkok
Manufacturing companies established in 1982
Companies listed on the Stock Exchange of Thailand
Thai companies established in 1982